Sinimun Station is a station on Seoul Subway Line 1 between Hankuk University of Foreign Studies and the major intersection in Seokgye.

References

Metro stations in Dongdaemun District
Seoul Metropolitan Subway stations
Railway stations opened in 1980